Peter Bauer may refer to:

 Peter Thomas Bauer (1915–2002), Hungarian-born British development economist
 Peter Bauer (computer specialist) (born 1957), American computer graphics professional
 Peter Matthew Bauer, American multi-instrumentalist, singer and songwriter